A poncho ("blanket", "woolen fabric") is an outer garment designed to keep the body warm. A rain poncho is made from a watertight material designed to keep the body dry from the rain. Ponchos have been used by the Native American peoples of the Andes, Valley of Mexico and Patagonia since pre-Hispanic times, from places now under the territory of Mexico, Ecuador, Colombia, Chile, Bolivia, Peru, Venezuela, and Argentina and are now considered typical American garments.

Types 
In its simplest form, the poncho is essentially a single large sheet of fabric with an opening in the center for the head. It often has an extra piece of fabric serving as a hood. Rainproof ponchos are normally fitted with fasteners to close the sides once the poncho is draped over the body, with openings provided for the arms. Many ponchos have hoods attached to ward off wind and rain.

Alternative ponchos are now designed as fashion items. They are the same shape but of different material. They are designed to look fashionable and provide warmth and to remain breathable and comfortable, rather than to ward off wind and rain. They are often made out of wool or yarn, knitted or crocheted. Ponchos with festive designs or colors can be worn at special events as well.

Traditional ponchos 

The poncho was one of the typical clothes of many South American and Mexican cultures. Although investigations have concluded that its origins could be Mexico, Ecuador or Peru, it is not known where the first ponchos were made. The poncho is now commonly associated with the Americas. As traditional clothing, the local names and variants are:

 Ruana, in cold regions of Colombia and Venezuela.
 Poncho, most Spanish-speaking countries and worldwide.
 Pala or Poncho, in Brazil (mainly in the South).
 Chamanto, only in Central Chile, poncho in the north and south.
 Jorongo, usually larger or full-length, and often used for special occasions or horse-back riding in Mexico 
 Gabán, typical in Michoacán, Mexico.
 Quechquémitl in many Mexican regions
 Poncho chilote, a heavy woolen poncho of Chiloé Archipelago.

Military ponchos 
The poncho was first used on a regular basis in the 1850s for irregular U.S. military forces operating on the U.S. Western Plains. These early military ponchos were made of gutta percha muslin, a latex-coated, waterproof cloth. Ponchos made of gutta-percha or India rubber coated cloth were officially adopted during the American Civil War, both as rain clothing and as a ground sheet for sleeping. While originally intended for cavalry forces, they were widely used by infantry as well; General Sherman's Union troops, lightly equipped and living off procurement demand from the local populace, wore ponchos during wet weather encountered during the march through Confederate Georgia to the sea.

Discontinued after the Civil War, the U.S. Army again issued ponchos of waterproof rubberized canvas to its forces during the Spanish–American War of 1898. Two years later, both the Army and the Marines were forced to issue waterproof rubberized cloth ponchos with high neck collars during the Philippine–American War in 1900. With the entry of the United States into World War I, both doughboys and Marines  in France wore the poncho; it was preferred over the raincoat for its ability to keep both the wearer and his pack dry, as well as serving as a roof for a makeshift shelter.

Just prior to World War II, ponchos were significantly improved during testing with the U.S. Army Jungle Experimental Platoon in the jungles of Panama, incorporating new, lighter materials and a drawcord hood that could be closed off to form a rain fly or ground sheet. Ponchos were widely used by United States armed forces during World War II; even lightly equipped foot-mounted forces such as Merrill's Marauders, forced to discard tentage and all other unnecessary equipment, retained their blanket and poncho. During the 1950s, new lightweight coated nylon and other synthetic materials were developed for military ponchos. The poncho has remained in service ever since as a standard piece of U.S. military field equipment. Today, the United States armed forces issue ponchos that may be used as a field expedient shelter. These garments are also used by hunters, campers, and rescue workers.

During World War II, the German Army (Wehrmacht) issued the Zeltbahn (see Shelter half), a poncho that could be combined to form tents. A typical four-man tent used four Zeltbahnen.

Versatility of Military Ponchos 

The versatility of Military Ponchos are very common specially when hiking or even in military field.  Building improvised tent, sleeping mats etc. can be observed.  Soldiers tend to use ponchos as a substitute of tent because it is portable and easy to install. Poncho Hooch, Poncho Lean-to, Poncho Litter, and Poncho Raft are some example on how you configure your own poncho in order to survive.

Ponchos in Chile
In the late 18th century, Basque navigator José de Moraleda wrote that the ponchos of the Huilliche of Osorno were less colorful than those of Chiloé Archipelago. The Huilliche are the principal indigenous population of Chile from Toltén River to Chiloé Archipelago. Mapuche ponchos were once highly valued, in the 19th century a poncho could be traded for several horses or up to seventy kilos of yerba mate. 19th century Mapuche ponchos were clearly superior to non-indigenous Chilean textiles and of good quality when comparing to contemporary European wool textiles.

Film
 Clint Eastwood famously wore a poncho as the lead character in each of the films he starred in for Sergio Leone (A Fistful of Dollars, For a Few Dollars More and The Good, the Bad and the Ugly). This gave him a distinct look in comparison to other cowboy characters in films which usually preferred dusters.

See also
 Aguayo, a typical Andean piece of cloth.
 Baja Jacket
 Bisht
 Belted plaid, a garment that could also double as a blanket or groundsheet.
 Cape
 Chasuble, a poncho-like Christian liturgical vestment
 Cloak
 Ruana
 Rebozo, a longer scarf like shawl without hole, tied around shoulder and can be used to carry a baby.
 Sarape, a poncho-like garment traditional to the Mexican state of Coahuila

References

External links

 
1850s fashion
19th-century fashion
20th-century fashion
History of clothing (Western fashion)
History of fashion
1970s fashion
2000s fashion
Chilean clothing
Latin American clothing
Peruvian clothing
Western wear
Coats (clothing)
Robes and cloaks
Native American clothing
Textile arts of the Andes
Western (genre) staples and terminology
Mapuche words and phrases